Bitter Ist's Dem Tod Zu Dienen (translation: It's Bitter to Serve the Death) is the second album by the Austrian black metal band Dornenreich. The album was originally released by CCP Records on June 25, 1999. The album was re-released by Prophecy Productions in 2003, and included the full, uncut booklet.

Track listing
 Nächtlich Liebend (translation: Nightly Loving) - 9:09
 Wundenküssen (translation: Kissing Wounds) - 13:42
 Reime Faucht Der Märchensarg (translation: The Fairy Tales Coffin Hisses Rhymes)- 12:21
 Federstrich In Grabesnähe (translation: Stroke of the Pen Near the Grave)- 5:01
 Leben lechzend Herzgeflüster (Eines Gedanken karge Silbensaat) (translation: Life Lusts For Heart Whisper (A Thought's Barren Syllable Seed)) - 9:34
 Woran Erkennt Mich Deine Sehnsucht Morgen?(translation: Whereby Will Your Longing Recognize Me Tomorrow?) - 7:50

Line-up

Eviga - lider, acoustic guitar, bass, vocals
Dragomir - drums, percussion
Dunklekind - synthesizer, vocals

Guest musician
Stefan Niederwieser - cello

References

1999 albums
Dornenreich albums